Fitchett may refer to:

Alfred Fitchett CMG (1836–1929), Dean of Dunedin from 1894 to 1929
Billy Fitchett (1872–1952), Anglican bishop in New Zealand
Chris Fitchett, Australian writer, producer and script editor
Frederick Fitchett CMG (1851–1930), Member of Parliament from Dunedin, New Zealand
Jack Fitchett (1879–1938), English footballer
John Fitchett (poet) (1776–1838), English poet
Margaret Fitchett (1875–1958), sometimes called Daisy Fitchett, New Zealand artist
Michael Fitchett (Australian sportsman) (born 1927), first-class cricketer for Victoria and Australian rules footballer
Michael Fitchett (basketball) (born 1982), New Zealand former professional basketball player
William Henry Fitchett (1841–1928), Australian journalist, minister, educator, founding president of the Methodist Ladies' College, Melbourne
John Fitchett Marsh (1818–1880), English solicitor, official and antiquary

See also
Feytiat
Fitch (disambiguation)
Phichit
Vichot